Jewels in the Crown: All-Star Duets with the Queen is a compilation album by American singer Aretha Franklin. It was released by Arista on November 12, 2007 in the United States. The album comprises a combination of classic duets spanning Franklin's career, and two newly recorded duets with Fantasia and John Legend, also containing two live duets, one from 1993, the other from 1998. The album concludes with a previously released rendition of "Nessun Dorma", of which Franklin had performed a version at the Grammy Awards of 1998, when she filled in last minute for Luciano Pavarotti.

The album peaked at #54 on the Billboard 200 album chart and reached number seven on the Top R&B/Hip-Hop Albums chart, her first to reach the top ten since 1998. The disc's first and only single, "Put You Up on Game", featuring Fantasia was released to radio on October 1, 2007. The single peaked at number 41 on the US Hot R&B/Hip-Hop Songs but missed the Pop chart.

Track listing

Charts

Weekly charts

Year-end charts

References

Vocal duet albums
Albums produced by Phil Ramone
Albums produced by Arif Mardin
Aretha Franklin compilation albums
2007 compilation albums
Arista Records compilation albums